Arum Lake is a lake on Vancouver Island, Canada, south of the Tsable River and south of the town of Comox.

References

Comox Valley
Lakes of Vancouver Island
Nelson Land District